Smyer Independent School District is a public school district founded in 1925 based in Smyer, Texas, United States that serves students in east central Hockley County. There are two schools in the district: Smyer Secondary (Grades 7–12) and Smyer Elementary (Grades (PK-6)). The two buildings were connected in 1979, that changed the look of the building.

History 
The first school building was actually unknown, as a previous school from the late 19th Century was built and soon abandoned after tax bonds were failed to be sent. Smyer, after its construction began, moved the old school and remodeled it for all ages in 1923. Smyer had the school teach from various ages, with Mr. Turney and Mrs. Turney serving as teachers at the school from 1925 to 1935.

In 1937, Clinton Smyer planned on a new complex for kids and teens to fit in, as the town was growing slowly and more room was needed, but after an unfortunate incident with money bonds, the plans were scrapped and never found.

In 1951, Smyer built a new elementary school that had various modern features for all kids to learn and become better. The high school and elementary school were separated for cost efficiency and budget friendly for the town.

In 1962, Smyer was given its first plans for a new school after the City Hall was formed and gave plans to O.R Walker, who later finished the remodeling of the school buildings

In 1972, Smyer Independent School District sold $5,300 unlimited tax school bonds to LeveIIand State Bank, and Underwood, Neuhaus Co. Inc., Houston.

In 1998, Smyer was put on new funds and later ran for a period of low income and high charges for the modeling of the school, causing the district to rebuild for years to come.

By the 1976 school opening, the district superintendent expected enrollment to be 245.

In the 2017–2018 school year, the district reported student enrollment, Pre K through grade 12, was 441, with 40.3 (Full Time Equivalent) classroom teachers.

Athletics 
The mascot for both schools is the Bobcats for the boys' teams, and the Ladycats for the girls' teams, who won back-to-back girls state champs in 2010 and 2011, and state runner up in 2013. In 2009, the school district was rated recognized by the Texas Education Agency. In 2022, The coaches have changed, with Funke being the main coach for the boys, and Nicholas being the coach for the girls.

References

External links
Smyer ISD - Official site

School districts in Hockley County, Texas